A Dog's Way Home is a 2019 American family adventure film directed by Charles Martin Smith from a screenplay by W. Bruce Cameron and Cathryn Michon, based on the 2017 novel of the same name by Cameron. The film stars Bryce Dallas Howard, Ashley Judd, Edward James Olmos, Alexandra Shipp, Wes Studi, Chris Bauer, Barry Watson, and Jonah Hauer-King, and follows a dog named Bella (voiced by Howard) who travels more than 400 miles to find her owner.

It was released in the United States on January 11, 2019, to mixed reviews from critics and grossed $80 million worldwide.

Plot
Lucas Ray and his friend Olivia, two residents of Denver, Colorado, find a puppy in a construction site along with many kittens and a mother cat. He names the dog Bella and takes her home to live with him and his mother, Terri. Over the years, Lucas plays with and takes care of Bella. However, Lucas also continues to feed the cats at the old house, putting himself in the crosshairs of Günter Beckenbauer, who intends to demolish the house. He calls the city about the cats who live there, which delays the demolition.

Vengeful, Günter notifies animal control that Bella is a pitbull (despite not looking like one), because, in Denver, Pitbulls are illegal, due to being a dangerous breed. That evening, an overzealous animal control officer named Chuck comes by to warn Lucas that if he finds Bella on the street, he will impound her. The next day, when Bella gets out to chase a squirrel, Lucas catches up to her and prepares to take her home, but Chuck confiscates Bella and takes her into the local animal shelter. Lucas picks Bella up, pays a fine, and is allowed to take her home, but he is warned that if Bella is captured again, she will be euthanized. To avoid this, Lucas sends Bella to live with Olivia's aunt and uncle in Farmington, New Mexico, until he and his mother can find another home outside of Denver's urban limit.

However, Bella misses Lucas and leaves Farmington and begins a 400-mile journey home, which will take more than two years to complete. During Bella's journey, she befriends an orphaned cougar cub, whom she names "Big Kitten." Bella and Big Kitten encounter many ordeals together, including being hunted by a pack of coyotes, but a group of men help Bella and frighten the coyotes away. The three men give Bella food at their campsite and upon learning who her owner is, try to call Lucas, only to be scared away by the sudden arrival of Big Kitten.  During the winter, Bella helps rescue a man buried in an avalanche. Eventually, she reaches a small town, where she is taken in by a homeless veteran named Axel until he soon dies. Back in the wilderness, Bella is attacked by coyotes again, but Big Kitten, now fully grown, returns and intervenes, successfully fighting off the coyotes. At each place Bella goes, she learns that each of her new friends has their own home, and how she must keep moving to get back to her family. After encountering further challenges, Bella finally makes it back to Denver, and she bids Big Kitten farewell before they part ways.

After briefly reuniting with the cat that looked after her as a puppy, Bella reaches the city's VA hospital, where she joyfully reunites with Lucas, Terri, and Olivia. Lucas prepares to take Bella to the vet to treat an injury Bella received due to being struck by a car, but when Lucas, Terri, and Lucas's friends bring Bella outside, Chuck arrives with several police officers, including police captain Mica. Chuck claims that he needs to confiscate Bella again, with the threat to have Lucas and anyone who interferes arrested otherwise. Captain Mica states that he enforces the law, which states that Bella must be impounded, but Lucas and Terri stand up for Bella and explain that there is no reason to confiscate Bella as the VA hospital is federal property, and thus it is not technically part of Denver. Captain Mica allows Lucas to keep Bella as he has no jurisdiction. Chuck threatens to pull Lucas over if he sees Bella leave the premises, but Captain Mica pulls Chuck from public field duty for his over-zealousness and the number of complaints against him, then orders the police officers not to pull anybody over just to impound a dog.

Lucas and Olivia manage to move into a new house in Golden with Bella, where they allow Pitbulls. Meanwhile, Big Kitten is revealed to be a mother herself as she and her cub watch over the city of Denver.

Cast
 Bryce Dallas Howard as Bella (voice)
 Shelby acts as Bella.
 Jonah Hauer-King as Lucas Ray
 Ashley Judd as Terri Ray
 Edward James Olmos as Axel
 Alexandra Shipp as Olivia
 John Cassini as Chuck
 Wes Studi as Captain Mica
 Brian Markinson as Günter Beckenbauer
 Barry Watson as Gavin
 Tammy Gillis as Officer Leon

Production
On November 7, 2017, Ashley Judd, Edward James Olmos and several others were cast in the film. On January 24, 2018, Barry Watson was added to play Gavin. Filming began in Vancouver, British Columbia on October 16, 2017, lasting through December 15.

Release
The film was released theatrically in the United States on January 11, 2019 by Sony Pictures.

Sony spent $18.8 million on the production of the film.

It was also released on Blu-ray on April 9, 2019 by Sony Pictures Entertainment, while the digital copy is set to be released on December 31, 2020.

Reception

Box office
A Dog's Way Home grossed $42 million in the United States and Canada, and $38.7 million in other territories, for a total worldwide gross of $80.7 million, against a production budget of $18 million.

In the United States and Canada, A Dog's Way Home was released alongside the openings of Replicas and The Upside, as well as the wide expansion of On the Basis of Sex, and was projected to gross $9–10 million from 3,090 theaters in its opening weekend. It made $3.3 million on its first day, including $535,000 from Thursday night previews. It went on to have a debut of $11.3 million, finishing third at the box office, behind The Upside and holdover Aquaman. In its second weekend the film made $7.1 million, finishing sixth.

Critical response
The website's critical consensus reads "A Dog's Way Home may not quite be a family-friendly animal drama fan's best friend, but this canine adventure is no less heartwarming for its familiarity." On Metacritic, which uses a weighted average, the film has a score of 50 out of 100, based on 14 critics, indicating "mixed or average reviews". Audiences polled by CinemaScore gave the film an average grade of "A−" on an A+ to F scale, while those at PostTrak gave it 3.5 out of 5 stars.

Chris Nashawaty of Entertainment Weekly called the film "Heartwarming, mildly funny, and occasionally thrilling without ever being anything more than just fine." Tomris Laffly, writing for RogerEbert.com, called it “a good dog movie with its heart in the right place" and gave it 3 out of 4 stars. Courtney Howard of Variety wrote: "For every shameless trick the filmmakers employ to pluck our heartstrings, resonant chords are struck elsewhere, teaching audiences about family, the power of unconditional love, and the ripple effects of compassion." Paul Byrnes of The Sydney Morning Herald gave it 3/5 stars and wrote: "There's not much variation on the old themes here. What's new is the film's definition of community and family."

Kennith Rosario of The Hindu was more critical, writing: "If a dog has to make a 400-mile journey across more than two years, there's enough scope to go beyond regurgitation of old dog film tropes." Jude Dry of IndieWire gave it a D grade, writing: "This franchise should follow its own advice: Find a purpose, a way home, or show yourself the doggy door."

See also
 A Dog's Journey (2019 film)
 A Dog's Purpose (2017 film)
 Bobbie the Wonder Dog 
  Fluke (1995 film)
 Homeward Bound: The Incredible Journey
 Quigley (2003 film)

References

External links 
 
 
 
 

2010s children's adventure films
2010s children's drama films
2019 films
American children's adventure films
American children's drama films
Polybona Films films
Columbia Pictures films
Films about dogs
Films based on books
Films directed by Charles Martin Smith
Films about pets
Films scored by Mychael Danna
Films set in Colorado
Films shot in Vancouver
Gay-related films
2010s English-language films
2010s American films